Kinshuk may refer to:

People 
 Kinshuk (professor)
 Kinshuk Mahajan
 Kinshuk Sen
 Kingshuk Nag

Plants 
 A common name for Butea monosperma